Stipe Drews (born Stipe Drviš, 8 June 1973) is a retired Croatian professional boxer. He won the WBA's version of the world light heavyweight championship title on 27 April 2007.

Amateur career 
As an amateur he took part at the European championships in 1996, but lost his third fight to the eventual champion Pietro Aurino. In the same year he was nominated for the 1996 Summer Olympics, but lost in the quarter-finals to Seung-Bae Lee. He was second at the Adriatic games in 1997. During his amateur career he was six times Croatian champion. He won 90 fights out of 100.

Amateur highlights 
 Amateur Record: 90–10
 6 time Croatian Champion
 Member of the 1996 Croatian Olympic Team as a Light Heavyweight. His results were:
 Defeated John Douglas (Guyana) TKO 2
 Defeated Timur Ibragimov (Uzbekistan) 10–9
 Lost to Lee Seung-Bae (South Korea) 11–14

Professional career 
Drews began his professional career in 1999. On 8 February 2003 he became European champion with a victory over Silvio Branco. After three title defenses he relinquished the title and instead fought against Paul Briggs for the WBC World Championship title. He lost this fight. Drews fought again several times for the European title and won all matches. Two world champion matches were called off. On 28 April 2007, Drews won in Oberhausen, Germany against Silvio Branco, and became the WBA World light heavyweight champion. He lost his title against Australian Danny Green in Perth on 16 December 2007. Drews lost the match on points.

Personal
Stipe Drews bears the nickname Spiderman which is due to his long arms and his speed. He currently lives in Pula, Croatia with his wife and one child, where he manages his beach bar Pomidor.

In March 2008 Stipe Drews participated in reality show called "Farma" on Croatian Nova TV. After enduring three weeks in the show, he started up a fist fight with 57-year-old photographer Stephen Lupino during live TV broadcast and thus was disqualified from the show.

Professional boxing record

See also
List of world light-heavyweight boxing champions

References

External links

 

|-

|-

1973 births
Living people
Croatian male boxers
Sportspeople from Makarska
Boxers at the 1996 Summer Olympics
Olympic boxers of Croatia
World Boxing Association champions
Mediterranean Games medalists in boxing
Mediterranean Games silver medalists for Croatia
Competitors at the 1997 Mediterranean Games
European Boxing Union champions
Southpaw boxers
World light-heavyweight boxing champions